Eoophyla clasnaumanni is a moth in the family Crambidae. It was described by Speidel and Mey in 2005. It is found in northern Thailand.

References

Eoophyla
Moths described in 2005